Georg Quistgaard (19 February 1915 - 20 or 21 May 1944) was one of 102 members of the Danish resistance to the German occupation of Denmark in World War II who were executed following a court-martial.

Biography
Georg Brockhoff Quistgaard was born on 19 February 1915 in Peder Skramsgade 11-3, Copenhagen to Cand.polit., secretary at Børsen Georg Brockhoff Quistgaard and wife Marie Bolette née Breyen, and was baptized on 3 May 1915 in the Church of Holmen. His father had died before his birth, on 18 December 1914 at Rigshospitalet at the age of 40.

In 1924 Quistgaard together with his mother and his older sister Bodil had moved to Sankt Mortensvej 6, Roskilde, the residence of his maternal grandmother Eleonora Isidora Wilhemine née Nielsen widow after brewer in Roskilde Marius Henrik Gustav Emil Breyen.

On Palm Sunday 1929 Quistgaard was confirmed in Roskilde Cathedral, still residing Sankt Mortensvej 6, Roskilde.

The following year he lived at the same address with his mother, his older sister Bodil and a housekeeper. The mother had not remarried and worked as a county treasurer.

As a youth, Quistgaard dropped out of high-school and travelled through Europe on foot and bicycle. In Paris, he met the two year younger Ellen Nielsen who was also from Copenhagen and they returned to Denmark.

On 24 September 1938 he and Ellen married in Copenhagen City Hall, while residing Dønnerupvej 1, Vanløse, he as an art dealer she as a secretary.

They opened a small shop of art works in Copenhagen, which went out of business in 1940.

In 1944 he and his wife had registered a phone as translators at the address Aabenraa 10, Copenhagen.

Resistance

During the occupation of Denmark, Quistgaard was connected to "Hjemmefronten" (the home front) og Special Operations Executive for whom he was a contact person and courier. He scouted for new airdrop sites, helped found the Hvidsten group as well as participating in their initial airdrop receptions.

Quistgaard and his wife provided support for Special Operations Executive (SOE) operatives organized by British Intelligence.

Additionally Quistgaard participated in the reception of allied airdropped weapons in the area of Gyldenløves Høj.

On several occasions Quistgaard demanded (in vain) that one SOE operative, an Englishman who had parachuted into Denmark, should be returned as inadequate. During a subsequent interrogation of this operative by the Gestapo, he identified Quistgaard as being with the Resistance.

On 13 January 1944 the Gestapo arrested Quistgaard in his home (Abenraa 10, Copenhagen) after an exchange of fire; they incarcerated him in Vestre Fængsel. His wife was not at home and managed to escape to Sweden, a fact which the resistance later communicated to Quistgaard.

The January 1944 issue of De frie Danske describes a drawn out firefight around 3 pm in the Copenhagen street Aabenraa between the Gestapo and Danish patriots. The newspaper learned that five people were arrested in a building there, after they ran out of ammunition.

On 28 January 1944 the Gestapo arrested Quistgaard's mother. The interrogation by the Gestapo took place at their headquarters in Dagmarhus. Quistgaard's prison diary and letters to his wife and mother suggest that he did not feel he was subjected to torture, but rather that there was some element of mutual respect between him and his interrogators. Quistgaard's initial interrogation included sleep deprivation, including one 28-hour interrogation, and thinly veiled threats of being beaten with a rubber baton.

This changed one day when his interrogator proclaimed: "It is up to you alone how long this woman has to remain here", after which the woman was revealed to be his mother. His mother was released after about two weeks of imprisonment.

On 2 March 1944 Quistgaard was moved with eight others to Schwerin. 

On 25 April 1944 he was transferred back to Vestre Fængsel.

On 12 May 1944 Quistgaard was put on trial as one of twelve members of the resistance in front of three judges from the SS. As witnesses, the prosecution presented two SOE operatives, known as Jacob Jensen and Bent. The former incriminated eight of the twelve to the point where they admitted to the charges. Quistgaard along with two other men and Monica Wichfeld were condemned to death with the execution pending any new acts of sabotage. Two days later the four death sentences were published in the Danish newspapers.

On the evening of 20 May 1944 Quistgaard wrote what was to be his last letter, to his mother. It was smuggled out the following day by Jørgen Kieler.

On 20 or 21 May 1944 Quistgaard and the two other men condemned at the trial were executed. Monica Wichfeld had her sentence commuted to life imprisonment but died in German captivity before the end of the war. The news of the execution was published by the papers on 23 May.

After his death
On 14 June 1945 an inquest in the Department of Forensic Medicine of the university of Copenhagen showed that Quistgaard was executed with gunshot wounds to the chest.

On 26 June a memorial service was held for Quistgaard in Grundtvig's Church and on 29 August he and 105 other victims of the occupation were given a state funeral in the memorial park founded at the execution site in Ryvangen. Bishop Hans Fuglsang-Damgaard led the service with participation from the royal family, the government and representatives of the resistance movement.

In 1946 his prison diary and letters were published, prefaced by Elias Bredsdorff. The royalties from the book were donated to Frihedsfonden.

Legacy and honors
 Together with Erik Briand Clausen and two other resistance members who fell victim to the German occupation Quistgaard is commemorated with a memorial stone on Gyldenløves Høj.

Bibliography

References

External links 

1915 births
1944 deaths
People from Copenhagen
Danish people of World War II
Danish resistance members
Danish male writers
People condemned by Nazi courts
Danish people executed by Nazi Germany
Resistance members killed by Nazi Germany